The Great (titled onscreen as The Great: An Occasionally True Story and later as The Great: An Almost Entirely Untrue Story) is a historical and satirical black comedy-drama television series loosely based on the rise to power of Catherine the Great, Empress of All Russia. All ten episodes of the first season were released on Hulu on May 15, 2020. The series stars Elle Fanning as Empress Catherine II and Nicholas Hoult as Emperor Peter III.

The Great was created, and is mostly written, by Australian playwright and screenwriter Tony McNamara, based on his 2008 play of the same name. The series does not aim for historical accuracy, and was described by Hulu as "anti-historical".

In July 2020, Hulu renewed the series for a second season which premiered on November 19, 2021. In January 2022, the series was renewed for a third season which is set to premiere on May 12, 2023.

Premise
The Great is a historical and satirical black comedy-drama about the rise of Catherine the Great from outsider to the longest-reigning female ruler in Russia's history. The series is fictionalized and portrays Catherine in her youth and marriage to Emperor Peter III of Russia, focusing on the plot to kill her depraved and dangerous husband.

Cast and characters

Main
Elle Fanning as Catherine the Great
Nicholas Hoult as Peter III of Russia
Hoult also plays Yemelyan Pugachev (season 2–present)
Phoebe Fox as Marial
Sacha Dhawan as "Orlo", Grigory Orlov
Charity Wakefield as Georgina Dymova
Gwilym Lee as Grigor Dymov
Adam Godley as Archbishop "Archie"
Douglas Hodge as General Velementov
Belinda Bromilow as Elizabeth
Bayo Gbadamosi as Arkady
Sebastian de Souza as Leo Voronsky (season 1)
Florence Keith-Roach as Tatyana (season 2–present; recurring season 1)
Danusia Samal as Lady Antonia Svenska (season 2; recurring season 1)

Recurring
 Louis Hynes as Vlad (season 1)
 Jamie Demetriou as Doctor Chekov (season 1)
 Christophe Tek as Tartar Nick (season 1)
 Charlie Price as Ivan (season 1)
 Alistair Green as Count Smolny (season 1–2)
 Abraham Popoola as Alexei Rostov (season 1)
 Stewart Scudamore as Tolsten (season 1)
Christianne Oliveira as Countess Belanova
Blake Harrison as Colonel Svenska (seasons 1–2)
 Dustin Demri-Burns as Voltaire (season 2; guest season 1)
 Freddie Fox as King Hugo of Sweden (season 2; guest season 1)
 Grace Molony as Queen Agnes of Sweden (season 2; guest season 1)
 Julian Barratt as Dr. Vinodel (season 2)
 Jane Mahady as Katya Velcra (season 2)
 Anthony Welsh as Father Basil (season 2)
 Ali Ariaie as Raskolvy (season 2)
 Ramon Tikaram as Uncle Varnya (season 2)
 Gillian Anderson as Joanna Elisabeth of Holstein-Gottorp (season 2)
 Jason Isaacs as Peter the Great (season 2)
 Henry Meredith as Maxim (season 2)

Episodes

Series overview

Season 1 (2020)

Season 2 (2021)

Season 3 (2023)

Production

Development
The series is based upon Tony McNamara's play revolving around Catherine the Great, which premiered at the Sydney Theatre Company in 2008. McNamara also wrote a film adaption of the play, "It had been a play and a film, and I was always struggling with the fact it was such a massive story for a film. I wanted to tell it as a story that goes for years and years." The series was initially pitched as having six seasons, having planned to introduce key historical figures in Catherine's life as the series continued.

On August 24, 2018, it was announced that Hulu was close to giving a pilot order to a miniseries about Catherine the Great. The series was written by Tony McNamara who also served as an executive producer alongside Elle Fanning and Marian Macgowan. Production companies involved with the pilot consist of Media Rights Capital, Echo Lake Entertainment, and Thruline Entertainment. On November 20, 2018, it was reported that Matt Shakman was directing the pilot. On February 11, 2019, it was announced during the Television Critics Association's annual winter press tour that Hulu had given the production a series order. On July 2, 2020, Hulu renewed the series for a second season. On January 11, 2022, Hulu renewed the series for a 10-episode third season.

Casting
Alongside the initial pilot announcement, it was confirmed that Elle Fanning and Nicholas Hoult had been cast in the pilot's lead roles as Catherine the Great and her husband Peter III of Russia, respectively. In November 2018, it was announced that Phoebe Fox, Sacha Dhawan, Charity Wakefield, and Gwilym Lee had joined the cast of the pilot. In January 2020, Sebastian De Souza, Adam Godley, and Douglas Hodge were added to the cast. On May 14, 2021, Gillian Anderson was cast in a guest starring role as Johanna, Catherine's mother.

Filming
Principal photography for the pilot episode had commenced by November 2018 in York, England with other filming locations expected to include Leicestershire,  Lincolnshire and Hever in Kent. The main filming locations were Hatfield House in Hertfordshire, Belvoir Castle in Leicestershire and the Royal Palace of Caserta in southern Italy. The loggia on the lake at Hever Castle doubled as the location for a Russo-Swedish peace conference. The fields of the St Clere Estate near Sevenoaks in Kent were used to stage battle scenes in episodes five and seven. Filming for season two began on November 4, 2020 and ended on July 17, 2021; another location used was Hampton Court Palace. Filming for season three began on July 12, 2022 and ended on December 6, 2022.

Release

Season 1 
The series premiered in the United States on May 15, 2020. In Australia, all episodes were released on Stan on May 16.  The series airs on Channel 4 and StarzPlay in the UK. It was released on StarzPlay 18 June 2020  and on Channel 4 on 3 January 2021. StarzPlay also distribute the series in Ireland, Germany, France, Italy, Spain, Benelux, Latin America and Brazil. More.tv broadcasts the show in Russia, Sky in New Zealand, and Amazon Prime Video in Canada.

Season 2 
The second season premiered on November 19, 2021 in the US, and on the same day in Canada, for Amazon Prime Video.

In the UK Starzplay premiered the second season on 5 December 2021  and on Channel 4 on 27 July 2022.

Season 3 
The third season is scheduled to premiere on May 12, 2023, with all 10 episodes on Hulu.

Historical accuracy
Hulu has described The Great as "anti-historical," and each episode's title sequence subtitled the series as an "occasionally true story" until the second season finale, when it changed to "an almost entirely untrue story." According to Los Angeles Times critic Robert Lloyd, "McNamara had jotted down some names, relationships and a few historical bullet points, torn up the paper, and started writing. And so must the viewer abandon himself to what's on the plate without a care to learning anything useful or even true about Russia or any of the real people represented here."

In the first season, Peter the Great is inaccurately mentioned as being the father of Peter III on numerous occasions.

Reception

Critical response

Season 1
The first season received mostly positive reviews from critics. On Rotten Tomatoes, it holds an approval rating of 88% based on 83 critic reviews, with an average critic rating of 7.51/10. The website's critical consensus reads, "The Great can't quite live up to its namesake, but delicious performances from Elle Fanning and Nicholas Hoult and a wicked sense of humor make it a pretty good watch." On Metacritic, it has a weighted average score of 74 out of 100 based on 33 reviews, indicating "generally favorable reviews".

Season 2
The second season received critical acclaim. On Metacritic, the second season has a weighted average score of 86 out of 100 based on 7 reviews, indicating "universal acclaim". On Rotten Tomatoes, it holds a "Certified Fresh" 100% approval rating based on 24 reviews, with an average critic rating of 8.40/10. The website's critical consensus reads, "The Great continues its revisionist reign stronger than before thanks to its addictive wit and marvelous cast − huzzah!"

Awards and nominations

Season 1

Season 2

See also
Catherine the Great (1995 television movie)
Ekaterina (Russian television series)

References

External links

2020s American comedy-drama television series
2020 American television series debuts
Adultery in television
American biographical series
Depictions of Catherine the Great on television
English-language television shows
Hulu original programming
Television series by Media Rights Capital
Television shows filmed in Italy
Television shows filmed in the United Kingdom
Television series set in the 18th century
Television series about royalty
Cultural depictions of Peter III of Russia
Primetime Emmy Award-winning television series